Egenhausen is a municipality in the district of Calw in Baden-Württemberg in Germany.

History
The villages of Egenhausen, Kapf, and Ölmühle were sold to the Duchy of Württemberg by the Margraviate of Baden in 1603. The Oberamt was dissolved in 1938 and Egenhausen, Kapf, and Ölmühle were subsequently assigned to the new Landkreis Calw. Egenhausen began a period of urban growth after World War II and had developed two new neighborhoods at its northern and western extremities by the mid-1960s.

Geography
The municipality (Gemeinde) of Egenhausen is located at the south-western edge of the district of Calw, in the German state of Baden-Württemberg. It lies along the border with the district of Freudenstadt to the south and west. Elevation above sea level in the municipal area ranges from a high of  Normalnull (NN) to a low of  NN.

Portions of the Federally protected  and  nature reserves are located in Egenhausen's municipal area.

Politics
Egenhausen has one borough (Ortsteil), Egenhausen, and two villages: Kapf and Ölmühle. There is also an abandoned village, Sindelsteta, in the municipal area. Egenhausen is a member of the Altensteig Municipal Association with the city of Altensteig and the municipality of Simmersfeld.

Coat of arms
Egenhausen's coat of arms portrays a thistle, in yellow a white flower and six yellow leaves, rooted to a field of red. The thistle is a reference to the flora of the Heckengäu. This coat of arms was awarded to Egenhausen by the Federal Ministry of the Interior alongside a municipal flag on 10 April 1969.

Transportation
Egenhausen is connected to Germany's network of roadways by Bundesstraße 28.

References

External links

  (in German)

Calw (district)